Dubai Gold Souk or Gold Souk, is a traditional market (or souk) in Dubai, UAE.  The souk is located in Dubai's commercial business district in Deira, in the locality of Al Dhagaya.  The souk consists of over 380 retailers, most of whom are jewelry traders. Some of the shops are as old as four decades, while some are as new as a year, as of 2019. The major items of mall includes Gold, Platinum, Diamonds and sometimes also deals in silver.

Dubai Gold Souk is bordered to the north by the Dubai Fish and Vegetable Market and the Deira Corniche near Baniyas Square at Sikkat al-Khali Street which is in close proximity to the Deira Bus Stand. On the other side of the Dubai Creek lies Dubai Textile Souk.

Dubai Gold Souk will be soon renovated. The Dubai Municipality plans to make Dubai Gold Souk an upbeat tourist destination.

Guinness World Record 
The Dubai Gold souk was host to the largest ring in the world weighing 64 kg. The piece is owned by Dubai-based Taiba.

References

External links 

 Dubai Gold Souk in news
 Top 10 Tips to Buy Gold in Dubai
 Dubai Gold
 3D Map for Navigation at Dubai Gold Souk
 Gold Rate in Dubai Today
 Qatar National Day Events
 Year of the 50th UAE
 Gold Rate Dubai
 21K Gold in Dubai

Retail markets in the United Arab Emirates
Tourist attractions in Dubai
Economy of Dubai
Jewellery districts
Jewellery retailers of the United Arab Emirates